The 2019–20 Egyptian Handball League was the 64th edition of the Egyptian Handball League, which Zamalek crowned for the second time in a row, After the season was canceled due to the outbreak of Covid-19, two games before the end, and Zamalek was given the title to top the table

League System

The 20219–20 Egyptian Handball League system consists of two phases, the first phase of which the 18 teams meet only once, the team plays 17 matches, then the first 8 teams ascend to the next phase after adding the results of the linked, and the team goes up by points of direct confrontations with the other seven teams.
The final stage, from one round, where each team plays 7 matches, and the one with the highest points is crowned.

The First Stage

Final stage

The final stageEach team ascends with live score points with the seven teams qualified for the final stage

The league was suspended on March 6, 2019, due to the outbreak of the new Corona virus, and then it was announced on May 22 that the season had been canceled with the clubs’ approval.

Final Decision

The Board of Directors of the Egyptian Handball Federation Egyptian Handball Federation announced giving Zamalek the title , due to its position on the league table, in addition to being the champion of the previous version, on May 22, 2021.

Cairo Derby

Only Match of The First Stage
date= Friday 29 November 2019

Resources

Handball in Egypt